The merk is a long-obsolete Scottish silver coin. Originally the same word as a money mark of silver, the merk was in circulation at the end of the 16th century and in the 17th century. It was originally valued at 13 shillings 4 pence (exactly  of a pound Scots, or about one shilling sterling), later raised to 14s. Scots.

In addition to the merks, coins issued include the four merk worth 56s or £2/16/- (£2.8); the half merk (or noble), 6 shillings and 8 pence or 80d; the quarter merk, 3s and 4d or 40d; the eighth-thistle merk, worth 20d.

"Markland", or "Merkland", was used to describe an amount of land in Scottish deeds and legal papers. It was based upon a common valuation of the land.

During the "Lang Siege" of Edinburgh Castle in 1572, the last phase of the Marian civil war, the goldsmith James Cockie minted half merks in the castle, while the supporters of James VI set up their mint at Dalkeith.

James VI issued silver merks with the lion of Scotland on the obverse and a thistle on the reverse. The last Scottish silver coinage of merks before the Union of Crowns of 1603, sometimes called the "eighth coinage" of James VI, were dated 1601, 1602, 1603, with some full thistle merks minted in 1604. James VI and I made the merk current in England on 8 April 1603, to be worth 13.5 English pence.

References 

Coins of Scotland